Irish for Luck is a 1936 British comedy film, also known as Meet the Duchess. Made at Teddington Studios by the British subsidiary of Warner Brothers, it was directed by Arthur B. Woods and starred Athene Seyler, Margaret Lockwood and Patric Knowles. Adapted from a novel by L.A.G. Strong, in the film an impoverished Irish Duchess tries to survive on her small income.

Plot
Ellen O'Hare (Margaret Lockwood) leaves Ireland and her penniless duchess aunt (Athene Seyler) to pursue a singing career in England. She encounters street musician Terry (Patric Knowles) and they eventually return without success to Ireland, to discover Ellen's aunt is now prosperous.

Cast
 Athene Seyler as The Duchess
 Margaret Lockwood as Ellen O'Hare
 Patric Knowles as Terry O'Ryan
 Gibb McLaughlin as Thady
 Edward Rigby as Hon. Denis Maguire
 Eugene Leahy as O'Callaghan
 George Dillon as Mooney
 Terry Conlin as Costello

Production
It was an early role for Margaret Lockwood.

References

Bibliography
 Low, Rachael. Filmmaking in 1930s Britain. George Allen & Unwin, 1985.
 Wood, Linda. British Films, 1927-1939. British Film Institute, 1986.

External links

Irish for Luck at TCMDB

1936 films
1930s English-language films
Films directed by Arthur B. Woods
1936 comedy films
British comedy films
Films set in Ireland
Films based on British novels
Warner Bros. films
Films shot at Teddington Studios
British black-and-white films
1930s British films